Ruminiclostridium  cellobioparum is a species of anaerobic cellulose-degrading Gram-positive bacterium found in the bovine rumen belonging to the family Oscillospiraceae.

References

External links 
 NCBI Taxonomy Browser
 Type strain of Clostridium cellobioparum at BacDive -  the Bacterial Diversity Metadatabase

Gram-positive bacteria
Bacteria described in 1944
Oscillospiraceae